The sextans was an Ancient Roman bronze coin produced during the Roman Republic valued at one-sixth of an as (2 unciae). The most common design for the sextans was the bust of Mercury and two pellets (indicating two unciae) on the obverse and the prow of a galley on the reverse. Earlier types depicted a scallop shell, a caduceus, or other symbols on the obverse.

See also
 Roman currency

Coins of ancient Rome